Narona clavatula is a species of sea snail, a marine gastropod mollusk in the family Cancellariidae, the nutmeg snails.

Description
The length of the shell attains 13.5 mm.

Distribution

References

 Jousseaume, F., 1887. Diagnoses de coquilles nouvelles de la famille des Cancellariidae. Le Naturaliste 9(14), sér. série 2

External links
 Sowerby, G. B., I. (1832). [Characters and descriptions of new species of Mollusca and Conchifera collected by Mr. Cuming. Proceedings of the Committee of Science and Correspondence of the Zoological Society of London. 2 (1832): 50-61.]
  Hemmen J. (2007) Recent Cancellariidae. Annotated and illustrated catalogue of Recent Cancellariidae. Privately published, Wiesbaden. 428 pp. [With amendments and corrections taken from Petit R.E. (2012) A critique of, and errata for, Recent Cancellariidae by Jens Hemmen, 2007. Conchologia Ingrata 9: 1–8

Cancellariidae
Gastropods described in 1832